Cyana sanguinea is a moth of the family Erebidae first described by Otto Vasilievich Bremer and William Grey in 1852. It is found in Taiwan and China.

The wingspan is 23–32 mm.

References

Moths described in 1852
Cyana